Injedu is a village in the Uyyalawada mandal of Kurnool district in the state of Andhra Pradesh in India.

References

Villages in Kurnool district

te:ఉయ్యాలవాడ